David Baboulene, is an English academic, story consultant, and author of humorous travel books, children's illustrated stories and academic works on story theory.

Life 
David Baboulene was born in Kenley, to the south of London, UK. He attended Oxted School in Oxted, Surrey, but dropped out at the age of 16 to undertake an apprenticeship in the British Merchant Navy. His experiences from his work on cargo ships are documented in his books Ocean Boulevard

and Jumping Ships, which recount his adventures around the world.

In 2003, Baboulene won the Euroscript Film Story competition – a Europe-wide competition sponsored by the European Film Commission. The first prize was to work with a professional scriptwriter to develop the story into a full screenplay. His interest in story theory developed from this point, leading ultimately to a PhD for his research into Narrative Theory from the University of Brighton in 2017.

Baboulene has subsequently written four practical academic works on Story Theory: The Story Book (2010), Story Theory (2014), Story in Mind (2019), and The Primary Colours of Story (2020),

Bibliography

Travel books

Children's books (illustrated by Kelly Chapman)

Story theory

References

External links 

Official UK David Baboulene website
Summersdale Publishers
DreamEngine Media Group Ltd

Living people
English humorists
English non-fiction writers
English science writers
Alumni of the University of Sussex
Alumni of the University of Brighton
English non-fiction outdoors writers
English travel writers
English screenwriters
English male screenwriters
British comedy writers
Maritime writers
English autobiographers
People from Kenley
English male non-fiction writers
Year of birth missing (living people)